Lamorlaye is a commune in the Oise department in the northern region Hauts-de-France. Its inhabitants are referred to as  Morlacuméen(e)s.

Population

See also
 Communes of the Oise department

References

Communes of Oise